Eupoa is a genus of spiders in the family Salticidae (jumping spiders). Originally known only from one species from Vietnam, several other species have been described since 1997, all from Asia.

Spiders of this genus have unusual pedipalps, and do probably not belong to the Salticoida, the main clade of jumping spiders. It is basal, but placement is not yet clear. Possibly Eupoa has branched from other basal groups like Lyssomaninae or Spartaeinae a long time ago.

Specimens of E. prima were collected from leaf litter.

Description
Eupoa are small salticids, with E. prima only reaching about 2 mm in both sexes. Although not closely related, it looks a bit like Neon, another litter dwelling species.

The abdomen is dark with light elongate transversal patches.

Species
, it contains eighteen species:

 Eupoa daklak Logunov & Marusik, 2014 — Vietnam
 Eupoa hainanensis Peng & Kim, 1997 — China (Hainan)
 Eupoa jingwei Maddison & Zhang, 2007 — China
 Eupoa lehtineni Logunov & Marusik, 2014 — India, Thailand, Vietnam
 Eupoa lobli Logunov & Marusik, 2014 — Malaysia
 Eupoa logunovi Wang & Li, 2022 — China
 Eupoa maddisoni Wang, Li & Pham, 2023 — Vietnam
 Eupoa maidinhyeni Wang, Li & Pham, 2023 — Vietnam
 Eupoa nezha Maddison & Zhang, 2007 — China
 Eupoa ninhbinh Wang, Li & Pham, 2023 — Vietnam
 Eupoa pappi Logunov & Marusik, 2014 — Thailand
 Eupoa pengi Liu, 2021 — China
 Eupoa prima Żabka, 1985 — Vietnam
 Eupoa pulchella Logunov & Marusik, 2014 — Thailand, Laos
 Eupoa schwendingeri Logunov & Marusik, 2014 — Thailand
 Eupoa thailandica Logunov & Marusik, 2014 — Thailand
 Eupoa yunnanensis Peng & Kim, 1997 — China, Laos
 Eupoa zabkai Wang, Li & Pham, 2023 — Vietnam

Footnotes

References
  (2000): An Introduction to the Spiders of South East Asia. Malaysian Nature Society, Kuala Lumpur.
  (2007): A basal phylogenetic placement for the salticid spider Eupoa, with descriptions of two new species (Araneae: Salticidae). Zootaxa 1432: 23-33. Abstract

External links
 Salticidae.org: Diagnostic drawings of most species

Salticidae genera
Spiders of Asia
Salticidae